Karla Borger (born 22 November 1988 in Heppenheim) is a German beach volleyball player. She won a silver medal at the 2013 World Championships alongside her teammate Britta Büthe. In 2014 they won the German Championship. At the 2016 Summer Olympics in Rio de Janeiro, she competed in women's beach volleyball with teammate Britta Büthe. They were defeated by the Brazilian team of Larissa França and Talita Antunes in the round of 16. After Büthe quit professional beach volleyball in 2016, Borger teamed up with Margareta Kozuch until 2018. When Kozuch decided to play with Laura Ludwig, she formed a new team with Julia Sude and won the German Championship in 2019. The team qualified for participation in the Beach volleyball at the 2020 Summer Olympics.

She is the daughter of Cordula Pütter, European Champion in Beach Volleyball in 1995.

Borger is using bikinis and training products manufactured by Adidas

References

External links
 
 Personal Website of Karla Borger

German women's beach volleyball players
1988 births
Living people
Beach volleyball players at the 2016 Summer Olympics
Beach volleyball players at the 2020 Summer Olympics
Olympic beach volleyball players of Germany
Universiade medalists in beach volleyball
Universiade gold medalists for Germany
People from Bergstraße (district)
Sportspeople from Darmstadt (region)
Medalists at the 2011 Summer Universiade